San Vittore may refer to:

In places
 San Vittore, Switzerland, a municipality in Graubünden, Switzerland
 San Vittore del Lazio, a comune in Lazio, Italy
 San Vittore Olona, a comune in Lombardy, Italy
 San Vittore, a hamlet in the municipality of Fossano, Piedmont, Italy

In buildings
 Chiesa di San Vittore (Esino Lario), a church in Esino Lario, Italy
 Osservatorio San Vittore, an observatory in Bologna, Italy
 Santi Vittore e Carlo (Genoa), a church in Genoa, Italy
 San Vittore alle Chiuse, an abbey and church in Genga, Marche, Italy
 San Vittore Prison (Carcere di San Vittore), a prison in the city centre of Milan, Italy

See also
 St. Victor (disambiguation)